The Wrongdoers is a 1925 American silent drama film directed by Hugh Dierker and starring Lionel Barrymore, Anne Cornwall, and Henry Hull.

Plot
As described in a film magazine review, a druggist who is philanthropic but poor, heads a robber gang that steals from the rich to aid the poor. His son, who is in love with the daughter of the woman his father befriended, foils a robbery planned by his father. The father and the man who was to have been robbed are killed. The son and the young woman are married.

Cast

References

Bibliography
 Munden, Kenneth White (1997). The American Film Institute Catalog of Motion Pictures Produced in the United States, Part 1. University of California Press.

External links
 

1925 films
1925 drama films
1920s English-language films
American silent feature films
Silent American drama films
American black-and-white films
1920s American films